Leo Everett Lewis III (born September 17, 1956) is a former professional American football player who played wide receiver for eleven seasons for the Minnesota Vikings and Cleveland Browns. He is the son of College Football Hall of Fame and Canadian Football Hall of Fame running back Leo Lewis. After retiring from active play, Lewis held the position of director of player development for the Vikings from 1992 to 2005. At the same time, Lewis wrote, edited and published the Vikings' player and alumni newsletter.

In 2023, he was named King Boreas for the Saint Paul Winter Carnival. 

Leo Lewis graduated from David H. Hickman High School in Columbia, Missouri and stayed locally to attend college at the University of Missouri.  Dr. Lewis worked for the University of Minnesota as the associate athletics director for student-athlete development from 2005 to 2014.

References

External links
ProFootballArchives stats

1956 births
Living people
Sportspeople from Columbia, Missouri
Hickman High School alumni
American football wide receivers
American football return specialists
Missouri Tigers football players
Minnesota Vikings players
Cleveland Browns players
Calgary Stampeders players
Hamilton Tiger-Cats players
Ed Block Courage Award recipients